Vata (died 1189) was a Hungarian prelate in the second half of the 12th century, who served as Bishop of Várad (present-day Oradea, Romania) from 1186 to 1189.

Career
Vata or Wasca possibly originated from the gens (clan) Miskolc, according to a record by early 19th-century archivist Márton Lendvay.

According to the diocese's list of bishops (Chartularium), Vata was elected Bishop of Várad by the cathedral chapter in 1186. Boleslaus, Bishop of Vác exchanged Árpád in Bihar County (present-day Arpășel, Romania) for the village of Kanyár in Szabolcs County with Lawrence, abbot of Gyulamonostor (today Mănăstirea, Romania) with the approval of Vata, the reigning bishop. The Chartularium mentions that Vata died in 1189, after three years of episcopate. He was succeeded by Elvin in that year.

References

Sources 

 
 
 

1189 deaths
12th-century Hungarian people
Bishops of Várad
12th-century Roman Catholic bishops in Hungary